Catherine Smith (or Catherina Smith) was an English novelist and actress, best known for her gothic fiction.  Almost all that is known of her is that she came from a wealthy family, and had acted at the Haymarket Theatre in London.

Novels
The Misanthrope Father, or The Guarded Secret (1807)
The Castle of Arragon: or, The Banditti of the Forest (1809; Worldcat)
The Caledonian Bandit or The Heir of Duncaethal (1811; WorldCat)
Barozzi, or The Venetian Sorceress (1815) (Internet Archive; WorldCat; Valancourt Books edition )

References

English women novelists
Year of birth unknown
Year of death unknown
English stage actresses
19th-century English women writers
19th-century English novelists